The Triscay Stakes is an Australian Turf Club Group 3 Thoroughbred horse race, for mares aged four-years-old and upwards, with set weights with penalties conditions, over a distance of 1200 metres at Randwick Racecourse in Sydney, Australia in mid February.  Total prize money for the race is A$200,000.

History
The race is named after champion two-year-old and three-year-old filly Triscay who won both the QTC Queensland Guineas and Oaks in 1991.

Name
 1995 - Triscay Fillies and Mares Quality Handicap
 1996–2005 - Triscay Fillies and Mares Quality Stakes
 2006 onwards -  Triscay Stakes

Grade
1996–2013 - Listed race
2014 onwards - Group 3

Venue
 1995–2001 - Rosehill Gardens Racecourse
 2002 - Canterbury Park Racecourse
 2003–2012 - Rosehill Gardens Racecourse
 2013 - Warwick Farm Racecourse
 2014 onwards - Randwick Racecourse

Winners

 2023 - Po Kare Kare
 2022 - Snapdancer
 2021 - Tailleur
 2020 - Sweet Deal
 2019 - Alassio
 2018 - Faraway Town
 2017 - Zestful
 2016 - Sultry Feeling
 2015 - Thump
 2014 - Lilliburlero
 2013 - She's Clean
 2012 - Dystopia
 2011 - Kiss From A Rose
 2010 - Patronyme
 2009 - Madame Pedrille
 2008 - Hot Danish
 2007 - Doubting
 2006 - Shannon Bank
 2005 - Golden Weekend
 2004 - Victory Vein
 2003 - Oomph
 2002 - Okanui
 2001 - Air She Goes
 2000 - Hot In The City
 1999 - Greta Hall
 1998 - Stoneyfell Road
 1997 - Shindig
 1996 - Dipping
 1995 - Light Up The World

See also
 List of Australian Group races
 Group races

External links 
First three place getters Triscay Stakes (ATC)

References

Horse races in Australia